Igor Tudor (born 16 April 1978) is a Croatian professional football manager and former player who is the current manager of Ligue 1 club Marseille.

Tudor spent most of his playing career at Juventus, winning several trophies during that time. He was a part of the Croatia national team at UEFA Euro 2004, the 2006 and 1998 World Cup, but missed the 2002 World Cup due to injury. Tudor announced his retirement on 22 July 2008 at age 30 after problems with his right ankle reappeared. He spent his final season playing for his youth club, Hajduk Split. 

As manager, he took charge of Hajduk from 2013 to 2015, and spent eight months with PAOK in the 2015–16 season. In Turkey, he managed Karabükspor from 2016 to 2017, and Galatasaray in 2017. From April to June 2018, Tudor managed Serie A side Udinese and in that time, saved the club from relegation to Serie B. In March 2019, he came back to Udinese. After he returned to Hajduk in January 2020, Andrea Pirlo invited Tudor to join his coaching staff at Juventus in August 2020, which offer Tudor accepted.

Club career

Early years
Tudor started his professional career at Hajduk Split in 1995 scoring 5 goals in 58 matches, being considered a revelation for his technique and ball control above the average of a defender.

Juventus
After three personally successful seasons at Hajduk, he was noticed and acquired by Italian giants Juventus in 1998. During his time with Juventus, he won the Croatian Player of the Year award in 2002. During his eight-year spell with the club, Tudor was in excellent form, despite injuries, and formed impressive defensive partnerships with the likes of Paolo Montero, Mark Iuliano, Gianluca Pessotto, Lilian Thuram, Ciro Ferrara, Alessandro Birindelli, Nicola Legrottaglie, Gianluca Zambrotta, Jonathan Zebina, Giorgio Chiellini and Fabio Cannavaro.

During the 2000–01 season under Carlo Ancelotti, Tudor had a prolific year, scoring six goals. The following season, with the return of his former Juventus coach Marcello Lippi, he was occasionally deployed as a midfielder, scoring four crucial goals (one against Torino in the Turin derby, two goals in Juventus' comebacks against Chievo and Hellas Verona and one during the match against title contenders Internazionale) in Juventus's successful Serie A title campaign. The following season, he also scored a notable goal against Deportivo de La Coruña in the last minute of a second round match of the 2002–03 Champions League, allowing the club to progress to the quarter finals of the competition, en route to the final, in which they were defeated by Italian rivals Milan on penalties.

During this period, Juventus had one of the strongest teams in the world, and Tudor contributed well, with over 150 total appearances for the club, scoring nearly 20 goals, as a centreback. After a major injury in 2004, however, Tudor was loaned out to Siena in January 2005 after seven seasons with Juve. Following the revocation of Juventus' 2004–05 and 2005–06 Serie A titles due to their involvement in the Calciopoli scandal, as well as the expiration of his loan contract with Siena, Tudor returned to Juventus, staying with the club despite their relegation to Serie B, but injuries kept him off the pitch for the whole season. His contract expired on 30 June 2007.

During his time at the club, Tudor won two Serie A titles, two Italian Supercups, a Serie B title and a UEFA Intertoto Cup, also reaching the final of the 2001–02 Coppa Italia and 2002–03 Champions League.

Return to Hajduk
Constantly struggling with injuries and mysterious bacterial infection of his ankle, Tudor was almost forced to end his career in 2007, but in June 2007 he decided to join his former club Hajduk Split after not renewing his contract with Juventus. After a highly cautious rehabilitation process his comeback was in the match against Zadar on 20 October 2007. This was his first official match in over 16 months. However, he was unable to reach his previous form and his ankle injury problems continued. On 22 July 2008, at the age of 30, he announced his early retirement due to his recurring ankle injury problems.

International career
Tudor played for the Croatia national team between 1997 and 2006. He also won several international caps for the Croatian under-17, under-19 and under-21 national teams between 1993 and 2000.

Tudor made his debut in Croatia's final match of the 1998 FIFA World Cup qualifying, a 1–1 draw at Ukraine on 15 November 1997, coming on as a substitute for Aljoša Asanović in the 89th minute. He was subsequently part of the Croatian squad that finished third at the 1998 FIFA World Cup in France. At the tournament, he made three appearances as a substitute in the closing stages of Croatia's games against Japan, Romania and the Netherlands.

After the 1998 World Cup, he made four appearances in the Croatian national team's unsuccessful qualifying campaign for UEFA Euro 2000, being in the starting line-up on all four occasions. He also appeared in six matches during Croatia's qualifying campaign for the 2002 World Cup, but missed the final tournament in South Korea and Japan due to an injury.

He returned to the national team during the qualifying stages for Euro 2004, appearing in seven qualifying matches. At the finals in Portugal, he appeared in two of Croatia's three group matches. In his first appearance at the tournament, a 2–2 draw against France, he scored an own goal to put the French side 1–0 up midway through the first half. His second appearance at the tournament came in Croatia's final group match against England, where he scored Croatia's second goal to keep their hopes alive after they found themselves 3–1 down in the second half. Frank Lampard, however, soon netted England's fourth goal and Croatia were knocked out of the tournament in the group stage.

Tudor was also included in Croatia's 23-man squad for the 2006 World Cup finals in Germany, having appeared in eight qualifying matches for the tournament, scoring two goals. He recorded his first goal of the qualifying when he scored Croatia's final goal in their 3–0 win at home to Malta on 30 March 2005. His second goal of the competition came in Croatia's 3–1 win at Bulgaria on 4 June 2005, when he put Croatia 2–0 up just over half an hour from time. At the 2006 World Cup finals, he started all of Croatia's three group matches and played the full 90 minutes in two of them. Croatia, however, were eliminated from the tournament after a 2–2 draw against Australia in their final group match, with Tudor receiving his second yellow card of the tournament for complaining about the penalty kick from which Australia scored a 1–1 equaliser. He made no further appearances for the national team following the tournament.

He earned a total of 55 caps, scoring 3 goals.

Style of play
Tudor was considered one of Croatia's best defenders in the period between the late 1990s and mid-2000s. Tudor was a large, hard-working, strong and imposing defender who excelled in the air, making him a dangerous goal threat during set pieces.

He was also a tight man-marker and a hard tackling defender, with great tactical intelligence. Although primarily a central defender, he was capable of playing anywhere along the back line and even as a defensive midfielder, which was made possible due to his tactical versatility, stamina, and his surprisingly capable technical skills, ball control and distribution for such a large and physical player.

Despite his talent, he was also prone to injuries, which is often thought to have affected his playing career.

Managerial career

Hajduk Split
Tudor was hired by Hajduk Split in August 2009 to be the assistant manager to Edoardo Reja who then took charge of the Croatian giant. Tudor dramatically increased his managerial knowledge during the seven months he spent watching and learning from Reja. In February 2010, Reja took charge of Lazio and because of that Tudor was fired from Hajduk; he did not join Reja in Italy.

In December 2012, Tudor was appointed by Hajduk's sporting director Sergije Krešić as the new Hajduk U-17 manager. After taking charge of the U-17 squad, he went to spend some time at the Juventus Center in order to improve his managerial skills with Antonio Conte. During his time with the U-17 squad, he managed to teach them how to play modern style football using the 3–5–2 formation. They managed to qualify for the U-17 Croatian Cup 2013 final.

In April 2013 he was hired as the new Hajduk Split manager. He lost his first away match against RNK Split, but in the 2012–13 Croatian Cup final first leg he defeated Lokomotiva 2–1 on Poljud. He achieved his first league victory against Osijek on 17 May 2013. He won the 2012–13 Croatian Cup after a 5–4 aggregate win against Lokomotiva in the final.

On 4 February 2015, Tudor resigned from Hajduk Split after managing the club for more than year and nine months.

PAOK
On 18 June 2015, Tudor was hired as the new manager of PAOK, signing a three-year contract. He lost 2–1 to Lokomotiva in his debut with PAOK for the second qualifying round of UEFA Europa League. He was dismissed on 9 March 2016 because of "unsuccessful results and disparaging comments about the quality of the team".

Karabükspor
On 18 June 2016, Tudor was hired as the new manager of Karabükspor, signing a one-year contract. After making fantastic results with Karabükspor, Tudor left the club in February 2017 to become the new manager of Galatasaray.

Galatasaray
On 15 February 2017, Tudor was hired as the new manager of Turkish side Galatasaray, signing a one and a half-year contract with the club. On 18 December, he was sacked by the club.

Udinese
On 24 April 2018, Tudor became the new manager of Italian team Udinese. His first win with Udinese came on 13 May 2018, in a 1–0 win over Verona.

After saving Udinese from relegation to Serie B, on 7 June 2018, Tudor left the club after not making a new deal with the club's management.

Return to Udinese
On 20 March 2019, he became for a second time, the manager of Italian team Udinese. His first win as Udinese's manager came on 30 March 2019, a 2–0 home win against Genoa.

Following a string of poor results, on 1 November 2019, Tudor was relieved of his managerial duties.

Return to Hajduk Split
On 23 December 2019, Hajduk announced that Tudor has been selected as new manager. On 2 January 2020, he officially took his role. 

On 2 February, Tudor led his first match with Hajduk after three and a half years, that The Whites won 3–0 against Varaždin.

Juventus 
On 23 August 2020, Tudor resigned from Hajduk Split, accepting Andrea Pirlo's offer to be his assistant at Serie A side Juventus.

He and Pirlo were sacked at the end of the season following Inter Milan's reclaiming of the Serie A title.

Verona
On 14 September 2021, Tudor was appointed at the helm of Serie A club Verona in place of Eusebio Di Francesco. Tudor immediately managed to turn the club's fortunes, ending the season in ninth place and achieving impressive performances throughout the season. On 28 May 2022, Verona announced to have parted ways with Tudor by mutual consent.

Marseille
On 4 July 2022, Tudor was named as the next manager of Olympique de Marseille in the French Ligue 1.

Career statistics
Source:

1 Including 1 match in 1998 Supercoppa Italiana and 2 matches in season 1998–99 UEFA Cup qualification.

International

Managerial statistics

Honours

Player
Juventus
Serie A: 2001–02, 2002–03
Serie B: 2006–07
UEFA Intertoto Cup: 1999
Coppa Italia runner-up: 2001–02, 2003–04
UEFA Champions League runner-up: 2002–03

Croatia 
FIFA World Cup third place: 1998

Individual
Croatian Footballer of the Year: 2001

Manager
Hajduk Split
Croatian Cup: 2012–13

References

External links
 

1978 births
Living people
Footballers from Split, Croatia
Association football midfielders
Association football defenders
Croatian footballers
Croatia youth international footballers
Croatia under-21 international footballers
Croatia international footballers
1998 FIFA World Cup players
UEFA Euro 2004 players
2006 FIFA World Cup players
HNK Hajduk Split players
HNK Trogir players
Juventus F.C. players
A.C.N. Siena 1904 players
Croatian Football League players
Serie A players
Serie B players
Croatian expatriate footballers
Expatriate footballers in Italy
Croatian expatriate sportspeople in Italy
Croatian football managers
HNK Hajduk Split managers
PAOK FC managers
Kardemir Karabükspor managers
Galatasaray S.K. (football) managers
Udinese Calcio managers
Hellas Verona F.C. managers
Olympique de Marseille managers
Croatian Football League managers
Süper Lig managers
Serie A managers
Ligue 1 managers
Croatian expatriate football managers
Expatriate football managers in Greece
Croatian expatriate sportspeople in Greece
Expatriate football managers in Turkey
Croatian expatriate sportspeople in Turkey
Expatriate football managers in France
Croatian expatriate sportspeople in France
Association football coaches
Juventus F.C. non-playing staff